Usolsky District is an administrative district (raion) of Perm Krai, Russia; one of the thirty-three in the krai. As a municipal division, it is incorporated as Usolsky Municipal District. It is located in the center of the krai. Its administrative center is the town of Usolye. Population:  The population of Usolye accounts for 40.0% of the district's total population.

Geography
About 70% of the district's territory is covered by forests, mostly coniferous.

History
The district was established in August 1940 as Voroshilovsky District. Present name was given to it in 1957.

Demographics
Ethnic composition (according to the 2002 Census):
Russians: 93.8%
Komi-Permyak people: 1.7%
Tatars: 1.4%

Economy
The economy of the district is based on forestry and timber industry, production of furniture, and agriculture.

Notable residents 

Vasily Boryagin (1919–1998), fitter and production-rationalizer, Honored citizen of Berezniki, Hero of Socialist Labor, born in Lenva
Andrey Voronikhin (1759–1814), architect and painter, born in Novoe Usolye

References

Notes

Sources

Districts of Perm Krai
States and territories established in 1940